Tabok can refer to the following places in the Philippines:

 Tabok, a barangay in the city of Mandaue
 Tabok, a barangay in the municipality of Danao, Bohol
 Tabok, a barangay in the municipality of Llorente, Eastern Samar
 Tabok, a barangay in the municipality of Hindang, Leyte
 Tabok, a barangay in the municipality of Lagonglong, Misamis Oriental